The Czechoslovak Group (CSG) is a Czech industrial-technological holding company, with its headquarters in Prague. CSG operated from 13 October 2014 to 14 January 2016 under the name Excalibur Group. Since January 2018, the owner of the Czechoslovak Group is Michal Strnad, the son of the founder, Jaroslav Strnad. CSG is one of the largest family-owned companies in the Czech Republic.

Holdings
The Czechoslovak Group holds shares in around 100 companies based mainly in the Czech Republic and Slovakia, including a majority stake in the Kopřivnice-based car manufacturer Tatra Trucks. In addition to the automotive industry, CSG holds shares in companies operating in the aviation, railway, defence, and other sectors. CSG's current portfolio also includes the production of engineering products for the automotive, railway and aerospace industries, watches, specialised vehicles and off-road trucks.

CSG works closely with General Dynamics European Land Systems, a Madrid-based manufacturer of ground defence vehicles, and Nexter Systems, a leading French manufacturer of military ground equipment. CSG acquired a 70% stake in Fiocchi Munizioni, an Italian munitions company.

References

External Links
 

Aerospace companies of the Czech Republic
Aircraft manufacturers of the Czech Republic and Czechoslovakia
Czech companies established in 2016
Defence companies of the Czech Republic
Holding companies of the Czech Republic
Companies based in Prague
Manufacturing companies established in 2016
Technology companies established in 2016